Phil Winston is an English dancer, dance teacher and choreographer.

Overview 
Phil Winston was born in Doncaster, South Yorkshire, England.  He began training in dance locally at Nellie Stagles School of Theatre Dance, later attending the Royal Ballet School.  As a professional dancer, Winston worked primarily in commercial styles, appearing in television and theatre shows, before deciding to pursue a teaching career and opening a dance school.  As a choreographer. Winston has worked on numerous productions, both in the UK and internationally.  He is a resident choreographer for Stageworks Worldwide Productions, which produces theatre and cabaret shows for various venues in Blackpool, most notably at Blackpool Pleasure Beach.  In 1998, Winston was awarded the Carl Alan Award for services to dance.

IDTA 
In 1984, Winston was appointed as an Examiner of the International Dance Teachers' Association, a leading international dance examination board.  In 1992, he was elected to the Modern Jazz Technical Committee, responsible for the redevelopment of the technique and syllabus for the IDTA Modern Jazz.  He is also a member of the Theatre Council, which maintains standards across all the IDTA theatre dance faculties, which also includes ballet, tap and theatrecraft.  As a member of the IDTA, Winton is a recognised authority on modern jazz dance, and frequently lectures at dance schools and colleges, seminars and summer schools.

College 
Winston is the Principal of the Phil Winston Theatreworks College in Blackpool, a professional training school for students seeking to pursue a career in dance and performing arts.  Former students include:

 Hayley Tamaddon
Olivia Phillip

References

External links
 Phil Winston's Theatreworks
 Stageworks Worldwide Productions

Dance teachers
English educators
English choreographers
Living people
Year of birth missing (living people)